This is a list of cathedrals in Mozambique sorted by denomination.

Roman Catholic 
Cathedrals of the Roman Catholic Church in Mozambique:

Anglican
Cathedrals of the Anglican Church of Southern Africa:

See also 

Lists of cathedrals

References

Cathedrals in Mozambique
Mozambique
Cathedrals
Cathedrals